Vilpulka Parish is an administrative unit of Valmiera Municipality in the Vidzeme region of Latvia.

Towns, villages and settlements of Vilpulka parish 
Vilpulka (parish center)
Brindas
Jaunāmuiža 
Virķēni

See also
Rūjiena (town)
Ipiķi Parish
Jeri Parish
Lode Parish

External links

Parishes of Latvia
Valmiera Municipality
Vidzeme